This list of awards for contributions to society is an index to articles on notable awards for contributions to society. It excludes humanitarian and service awards, religion-related awards, peace prizes, law enforcement awards and honors and legal awards, which are covered by separate lists. The list is organized by region and country of the award sponsor, but some awards are open to people or organizations around the world.

Awards

See also
 Lists of awards
 List of humanitarian and service awards
 List of religion-related awards
 List of peace prizes
 List of law enforcement awards and honors 
 List of legal awards

References

contributions to society and culture